The Isthmus of Panama, also historically known as the Isthmus of Darien, is the narrow strip of land that lies between the Caribbean Sea and the Pacific Ocean, linking North and South America. It contains the country of Panama and the Panama Canal. Like many isthmuses, it is a location of great geopolitical and strategic importance.

The isthmus is thought to have been finally formed around 3 million years ago, separating the Atlantic and Pacific Oceans and causing the creation of the Gulf Stream. This was first suggested in 1910 by North American paleontologist Henry Fairfield Osborn. He based the proposal on the fossil record of mammals in Central America. This conclusion provided a foundation for Alfred Wegener when he proposed the theory of continental drift in 1912.

History 

Vasco Núñez de Balboa heard of the South Sea from natives while sailing along the Caribbean coast. On 25 September 1513 his expedition became the first Europeans to see the Pacific Ocean from the Americas. In 1519 the town of Panamá was founded near a small indigenous settlement on the Pacific coast. After the Spanish colonization of Peru, it developed into an important port of trade and became an administrative centre. In 1671 the Welsh privateer Henry Morgan crossed the Isthmus of Panamá from the Caribbean side and destroyed the city. The town was relocated some kilometers to the west at a small peninsula. The ruins of the old town, Panamá Viejo, are preserved and were declared a UNESCO World Heritage Site in 1997.

Silver and gold from the viceroyalty of Peru were transported overland across the isthmus by Spanish Silver Train to Porto Bello, where Spanish treasure fleets shipped them to Seville and Cádiz from 1707. Lionel Wafer spent four years between 1680 and 1684 among the Kuna or Guna Indians. Scotland tried to establish a settlement in 1698 through the Darien scheme.

The California Gold Rush, starting in 1849, brought a large increase in the transportation of people from the Atlantic to the Pacific. Steamships brought gold diggers from eastern US ports, who trekked across the isthmus by foot, horse, and later rail. On the Pacific side, they boarded Pacific Mail Steamship Company vessels headed for San Francisco.

Ferdinand de Lesseps, the developer of the Suez Canal, started a Panama Canal Company in 1880 that went bankrupt in 1889 in the Panama scandals. In 1902–1904, the United States forced Colombia to grant independence to the Department of the Isthmus, bought the remaining assets of the Panama Canal Company, and finished the canal in 1914.

Geology 

A significant body of water (referred to as the Central American Seaway) once separated the continents of North and South America, allowing the waters of the Pacific and Atlantic Oceans to mix freely. Beneath the surface, two plates of the Earth's crust were slowly colliding, forcing the Cocos Plate to slide under the Caribbean Plate. The pressure and heat caused by this collision led to the formation of underwater volcanoes, some of which grew large enough to form islands. Meanwhile, movement of the two tectonic plates was also pushing up the sea floor, eventually forcing some areas above sea level. However tectonic rifting can also lower areas and sea levels will fluctuate due to other reasons. The Isthmus of Panama is not the only part of central America that has been low lying in the last tens of million years.  This means the date of first closure and final closure of the Central American Seaway before it was artificially reopened to a degree by the Panama Canal is likely to remain controversial as noted by those who proposed 15 million years ago for first closure except for narrow passages on geological grounds and subsequence suggestions that last closure might be more recent as genetic drift data on say mangroves with standard models as a species involved in the Great American Interchange has 95% confidence levels of only as old as 1.75 million years with a median  of 750,000 years ago.

Over time, massive amounts of sediment from North and South America filled the gaps between the newly forming islands. Over millions of years, the sediment deposits added to the islands until the gap was completely filled. By no later than 4.5 million years ago, an isthmus had formed between North and South America. However, an article in Science magazine stated that zircon crystals in middle Miocene bedrock from northern Colombia indicated that by 10 million years ago, it is likely that instead of islands, a full isthmus between the North and South American continents had already formed where the Central American Seaway had been previously.  A genomic study of army ants also tends to confirm that the isthmus emerged millions of years earlier than had long been thought.

However the process of formation of the isthmus and its implications is geologically and ecologically more nuanced. There is isotopic and carbonate deposition rate evidence that deep water connections below  were broken between the Atlantic and Pacific by between 12 and 9.2 million years ago. However exchange of surface water so as to maintain western Atlantic  salinity at eastern Pacific values continued until about 4.6 million years ago with current Caribbean values being reached by about 4.2 million years ago although there seems to have been a last definite temporary breach as recently as 2.45 million years ago. The ocean sediments between the volcanoes on the isthmus seem to have been laid down as recently as 3.1 million ears ago  and the exchange of organism gene pools between the two oceans appears to have continued until about 3 million years ago as well. The largest exchange of animals over the land bridge only happened after this time, although some species had made the crossing earlier, perhaps by rafting or brief periods of connection separated by periods of a high water flow between an arc of volcanic islands not conducive to swimming or rafting. 

Evidence also suggests that the creation of this land mass and the subsequent warm, wet weather over northern Europe resulted in the formation of a large Arctic ice cap and contributed to the current ice age. That warm currents can lead to glacier formation may seem counterintuitive, but heated air flowing over the warm Gulf Stream can hold more moisture. The result is increased precipitation that contributes to snow pack.

The formation of the Isthmus of Panama also played a major role in biodiversity on the planet. The bridge made it easier for animals and plants to migrate between the two continents. This event is known in paleontology as the Great American Interchange. For instance, in North America, the opossum, armadillo, and porcupine all trace back to ancestors that came across the land bridge from South America. Likewise, bears, cats, dogs, horses, llamas, and raccoons all made the trek south across the isthmus.

Biosphere 
As the connecting bridge between two vast land masses, the Panamanian biosphere is filled with overlapping fauna and flora from both North and South America. There are, for example, over 978 species of birds in the isthmus area. The tropical climate also encourages a myriad of large and brightly colored species, insects, amphibians, birds, fish, and reptiles. Divided along its length by a mountain range, the isthmus's weather is generally wet on the Atlantic (Caribbean) side but has a clearer division into wet and dry seasons on the Pacific side.

See also
 Darién Gap
 Gulf of Darién
 Isthmo-Colombian Area
 Postage stamps and postal history of the Canal Zone

References

Citations

General sources 

 
 

 
 
  Excerpt from the 1729 Knapton edition
  (Original German article from 1912 with English translation from 2003.)

External links 
 

Geography of Central America
Panama
Panama
Landforms of Panama
Natural history of Central America
Regions of Central America